Maxim Gennadyevich Iglinsky (born 18 April 1981, in Astana) is a Kazakh former road racing cyclist who rode professionally from 2004 to 2014 with the , Domina Vacanze,  and  teams.

Career
Iglinsky won stage 6 of the 2007 Critérium du Dauphiné Libéré. He is the elder brother of Valentin Iglinsky.

In spring 2012, he prevailed in one of the Ardennes Classic races, Liège–Bastogne–Liège. He broke away from the chasing group with Joaquim Rodríguez, subsequently dropping him and flying by race leader Vincenzo Nibali with one kilometer to go to win solo.

He was provisionally suspended in October 2014 after testing positive for EPO in August 2014. His brother Valentin Iglinsky was suspended on 10 September for testing positive, also in August 2014. Maxim Iglinsky received a two-year ban, dating from the publication of the positive test, expiring 30 September 2016.

Major results

2002
 1st  Overall Vuelta a la Independencia Nacional
1st Stage 8
 2nd Overall Tour of China
1st Stage 2
 4th Overall Tour of Japan
2003
 1st Stage 3 Tour de Bulgaria
 2nd Flèche Ardennaise
 7th Overall Grand Prix Guillaume Tell
 8th Omloop van het Houtland
2004
 1st  Overall Vuelta a la Independencia Nacional
 1st Prix de la Slantchev Brjag
 2nd  Road race, Asian Road Championships
 3rd Road race, National Road Championships
 3rd Overall Tour of Greece
1st Prologue
 3rd Memorial Philippe Van Coningsloo
 5th Overall Tour de l'Avenir
 5th Boucles de l'Aulne
 6th Overall Tour de Beauce
2005
 1st GP Cittá di Camaiore
 1st Stage 6 Deutschland Tour
 2nd Time trial, National Road Championships
 5th Giro del Lazio
2006
 National Road Championships
1st  Time trial
3rd Road race
2007
 1st  Road race, National Road Championships
 1st Stage 6 Critérium du Dauphiné Libéré
2008
 1st  Mountains classification, Tour de Suisse
 9th Overall Tour de Romandie
1st Stage 1
2009
 3rd E3 Prijs Vlaanderen
 8th GP Ouest–France
2010
 1st Montepaschi Strade Bianche
 3rd Overall Tour Méditerranéen
 4th Overall Tirreno–Adriatico
 7th Gent–Wevelgem
 8th Milan–San Remo
 8th Tour of Flanders
2012
 1st Liège–Bastogne–Liège
 2nd Strade Bianche
2013
 1st Tour of Almaty
 1st Stage 4 Tour of Belgium
 1st Stage 1 (TTT) Vuelta a España
 8th Road race, UCI Road World Championships
 8th Dwars door Vlaanderen
 9th Overall Eneco Tour
2014
 2nd  Road race, Asian Road Championships

Grand Tour general classification results timeline

References

External links

Palmares on Cycling Base 

Kazakhstani male cyclists
1981 births
Living people
Olympic cyclists of Kazakhstan
Cyclists at the 2004 Summer Olympics
Cyclists at the 2008 Summer Olympics
Cyclists at the 2010 Asian Games
Sportspeople from Astana
Doping cases in cycling
Kazakhstani sportspeople in doping cases
Asian Games competitors for Kazakhstan
20th-century Kazakhstani people
21st-century Kazakhstani people